The Baltimore Morning Herald was a daily newspaper published in Baltimore in the beginning of the twentieth century.

History
The first edition was published on February 10, 1900. The paper succeeded the Morning Herald and was absorbed by the Baltimore Evening Herald on August 31, 1904, appearing on weekends as the Baltimore Sunday Herald. Its offices were located at the northwest corner of St. Paul and East Fayette Streets, facing the recently completed Baltimore City Circuit Courthouses of 1896-1900 (renamed for Clarence M. Mitchell, Jr. in 1985).

The building was devastated by the Great Baltimore Fire of February 1904 and stood on the northern edge of the "Burnt District". The Herald printed an edition the first night of the fire on the press of The Washington Post, in exchange for providing photographs to The Post, but could not continue this arrangement because of a long-standing arrangement between the Post and the Baltimore Evening News. For the next five weeks The Herald was printed nightly on the press of the Philadelphia Evening Telegraph and transported  to Baltimore on a special train, provided free of charge by the B&O Railroad.

In June 1906, the paper was purchased by competitor Charles H. Grasty, editor/owner of The Evening News, and Gen. Felix Agnus, owner/publisher of The Baltimore American. Assets, staff and resources of the Herald were divided between the two publications, which later merged under the ownership of newspaper magnate Frank Munsey.

The Herald's most notable writer and editor was H. L. Mencken, who described his experiences in Newspaper Days (1941), the second volume of his autobiographical trilogy.

References

Defunct newspapers published in Maryland
History of Baltimore
Newspapers established in 1900
1900 establishments in Maryland